Tamar de Sola Pool (née Hirshenson; 1890-1981), was an Israeli-American academic and zionist who served as president of the Hadassah Women's Zionist Organization of America from 1939 to 1943. Born in Jerusalem to Rabbi Chaim Hirschenson and Eva (Cohen) Hirschenson, the family moved to New Jersey in 1904, and Rabbi Hirschenson became a congregational rabbi. In 1917, Hirshenson married David de Sola Pool, the rabbi of Congregation Shearith Israel in New York. She died in 1981.

References

External links
Guide to the Hadassah Archives on Long-term Deposit at the American Jewish Historical Society
 Marjorie Lehman, Tamar de Sola Pool, at: the Jewish Women's Archive's Encyclopedia of Jewish Women

1981 deaths
American Zionists
1890 births
People from Jerusalem
Israeli emigrants to the United States
Hadassah Women's Zionist Organization of America members
Israeli women academics
Israeli women activists
Zionist activists
American women academics
20th-century American women
20th-century American Jews